Whitewater State Park is a state park of Minnesota, United States, preserving a stretch of the Whitewater River surrounded by rocky bluffs. It is located in Winona County in the southeastern blufflands area of the state. The  park features scenic overlooks and trout fishing in the spring-fed Whitewater River and Trout Run Creek.

Historic structures
The park's 1930s facilities are listed on the National Register of Historic Places as the Whitewater State Park CCC/WPA/Rustic Style Historic Resources.  The  historic district includes 29 contributing properties.  The district was listed for having state-level significance in the themes of architecture, entertainment/recreation, landscape architecture, and politics/government.  It was nominated for its examples of New Deal federal work relief, diverse National Park Service rustic design, and landscape architecture on a challenging site.

Landforms
The park's bedrock is lower Paleozoic sedimentary rocks, with limestone and dolomite especially prevalent near the surface.  It is highly dissected, and the Whitewater River has cut deep valleys into the bedrock.  It is an area of karst topography.

Lifeforms

The park is located where the Rochester Plateau Subsection and the Blufflands Subsection meet, both of which are part of the Paleozoic Plateau section of the Eastern Broadleaf Forest Province.

2007 flood
The August 18 and 19, 2007 Midwest flooding caused extensive damage to the park. The park is in the Driftless Area, where soils are thin and less able to retain water; they lie atop porous rock into and through which surface waters can rapidly drain into the water table.  The steep hills and bluffs and deep coulees give steep gradients to the drainage and makes streams highly erosive.  As the rains far exceeded the absorption rate of the soils, flash floods rapidly overflowed the river and spread across the valley floors.

About 500 campers were staying in the park at the time. Three bridges were destroyed, and campgrounds, bathhouses, a group dining hall, and water and sewer systems suffered extensive damage.  Damage was in excess of four million dollars, and the park was closed to the public on August 20, 2007, and remained closed the balance of the year.  On March 1, 2008 it partially reopened, but many of its amenities still had unrepaired damage.

References

External links

Whitewater State Park

1919 establishments in Minnesota
Civilian Conservation Corps in Minnesota
Driftless Area
IUCN Category V
Park buildings and structures on the National Register of Historic Places in Minnesota
Protected areas established in 1919
Protected areas of Winona County, Minnesota
Rustic architecture in Minnesota
State parks of Minnesota
Works Progress Administration in Minnesota
Historic districts on the National Register of Historic Places in Minnesota
National Register of Historic Places in Winona County, Minnesota